Asaphis deflorata is a species of bivalve belonging to the family Psammobiidae.

The species is found in Central America, Red Sea, Indian and Pacific Ocean.

References

Psammobiidae
Bivalves described in 1758
Taxa named by Carl Linnaeus